Geyssans is a commune in the Drôme department in southeastern France.

Location
It is located north of Génissieux, off the D52 which goes towards St Michel s/ Savasse, and Montmiral. The main road ends up in Reculais, a former commune now part of Arthémonay.

Population

Sights
There is a pretty little ancient chapel to visit in Geyssans named St Ange, located on the very top of the hill. There is also a very clear view, on a good day, on the Rhone valley and the Vercors Plateau.

See also
Communes of the Drôme department
Official website of Geyssans

References

Communes of Drôme